This is a list of public art in Bloomington, Indiana.

This list applies only to works of public art accessible in an outdoor public space. For example, this does not include artwork visible inside a museum.  

Most of the works mentioned are sculptures. When this is not the case (i.e. sound installation, for example) it is stated next to the title.

Bloomington

References

Buildings and structures in Bloomington, Indiana
Bloomington
Tourist attractions in Bloomington, Indiana
Bloomington